Lee Jae-sung (born 10 August 1992) is a South Korean professional footballer who plays as an attacking midfielder or winger for Bundesliga club Mainz 05 and the South Korea national team.

Club career

Jeonbuk Hyundai Motors
Lee joined Jeonbuk Hyundai Motors in 2014 and made his debut in the 2014 AFC Champions League match against Yokohama F. Marinos on 26 February. Choi Kang-hee, the manager of Jeonbuk at the time, praised his ability which kept balance about attack and defense of team, and actively used him, the newcomer.

In 2016, he spent his best season by providing 17 assists during a year and winning the 2016 AFC Champions League.

In the 2017 K League 1, he won the Most Valuable Player award after having eight goals and ten assists during 28 appearances.

Holstein Kiel
In July 2018, Lee joined 2. Bundesliga club Holstein Kiel on a three-year deal until 30 June 2021. The transfer fee paid to Jeonbuk was reported as €1.5 million. He played his first game against Hamburger SV on 4 August, and was named the player of the matchday by leaving a deep impression on Kicker with two assists.

After the end of the 2019–20 season, his goal against Karlsruher SC was selected as Kiel's Goal of the Season.

On 13 January 2021, he played full time and scored the fourth penalty in a 2020–21 DFB-Pokal match, where Kiel won 6–5 on penalties after drawing 2–2 against Bayern Munich. Afterwards, Kiel reached the semi-finals of DFB-Pokal for the first time in history, but they were eliminated by Borussia Dortmund.

Kiel also finished third in the 2020–21 2. Bundesliga, qualifying for the promotion play-off. In the two-legged play-off, Lee scored a goal and provided an assist, contributing to all two of Kiel's goals, but they lost 5–2 on aggregate to Köln.

Mainz 05
In July 2021, Lee joined Bundesliga club Mainz 05 on a three-year deal until 30 June 2024.

After the first half of the 2021–22 season, Lee was ranked 10th in attacking midfielder rankings of Kicker.

In February 2023, Lee led Mainz to three Bundesliga victories by having three goals and two assists. He was named the player of the 22nd matchweek by Kicker, and was nominated for the Bundesliga Player of the Month.

International career
In the 2017 EAFF Championship, Lee led South Korea's title, and was named the Most Valuable Player and the Best Duel Player.

Lee was named in South Korea's squad for the 2018 FIFA World Cup, and played all three games in the group stage. He also participated in the 2022 FIFA World Cup, helping South Korea advance to the knockout stage.

Career statistics

Club

International
Scores and results list South Korea's goal tally first, score column indicates score after each Lee goal.

Honours
Jeonbuk Hyundai Motors
K League 1: 2014, 2015, 2017
AFC Champions League: 2016

South Korea U23
Asian Games: 2014

South Korea
EAFF Championship: 2015, 2017

Individual
K League 1 Best XI: 2015, 2016, 2017
K League 1 Young Player of the Year: 2015
AFC Champions League All-Star Squad: 2016
AFC Champions League Opta Best XI: 2016
K League 1 Most Valuable Player: 2017
EAFF Championship Most Valuable Player: 2017

References

External links

 Profile at the 1. FSV Mainz 05 website 
 
 Lee Jae-sung – National Team stats at KFA 
 
Lee Jae-sung at Asian Games Incheon 2014

1992 births
Living people
Sportspeople from Ulsan
Association football midfielders
South Korean footballers
South Korea international footballers
South Korea under-23 international footballers
Footballers at the 2014 Asian Games
Asian Games medalists in football
Asian Games gold medalists for South Korea
Medalists at the 2014 Asian Games
2018 FIFA World Cup players
2019 AFC Asian Cup players
Jeonbuk Hyundai Motors players
Holstein Kiel players
1. FSV Mainz 05 players
K League 1 players
Bundesliga players
2. Bundesliga players
Korea University alumni
South Korean expatriate footballers
Expatriate footballers in Germany
South Korean expatriate sportspeople in Germany
21st-century South Korean people
2022 FIFA World Cup players